St. Augustine Church is a historic Roman Catholic church in the Lawrenceville neighborhood of Pittsburgh, Pennsylvania. It has remained in use as a parish church since construction, currently serving the Parish of Our Lady of the Angels, which with St. Maria Goretti forms the Bloomfield/Garfield/Lawrenceville Grouping within the Diocese of Pittsburgh. The church has been operated by the Capuchin Friars since 1873 and is the headquarters of the Capuchin Province of St. Augustine.

The Romanesque Revival structure was designed by John T. Comès of the firm of Rutan & Russell. Built in 1901 of yellow brick with terra cotta trim, it is cruciform in plan with two tall towers, a clerestory, and a dome. It was added to the List of Pittsburgh History and Landmarks Foundation Historic Landmarks in 1998. In 2019, it was listed as a contributing property in the Lawrenceville Historic District.

History
St. Augustine parish was founded in 1863 by German American residents of Lawrenceville, who had been operating a small school there for a few years. The first church was built in 1862–3 at the corner of 37th and Butler Streets. In 1873, the parish was placed under the jurisdiction of the Order of Friars Minor Capuchin. By the end of the century, the church building was in disrepair and the wealthy Frauenheim family offered a gift of $50,000 to build a new one. The chosen site was further up 37th Street, which would allow the old church to remain in use during construction. The new building was designed by John T. Comes of Rutan & Russell, who based his plans on St. Benno's Church in Munich. The ambitious design featured twin  towers and came in at over twice the original budget when bids were received. Fortunately for the parish, the Frauenheims were willing to increase their donation to match.

Construction started in August 1899 and the finished church was dedicated on May 12, 1901. St. Augustine parish continued to operate until 1993, when population loss in Lawrenceville forced the diocese to consolidate its parishes, some of which were only a few blocks apart. St. Augustine was merged with three other Lawrenceville parishes—Holy Family, St. John the Baptist, and St. Mary's—to form the Parish of Our Lady of Angels. St. Augustine was kept as the main church and the other three were eventually closed.

Architecture
Inspired by St. Benno's Church in Munich, it is an example of Romanesque Revival architecture with twin  towers and a high dome. The front of the church features three large arched doorways with decorative tympana under a niche containing a  statue of St. Augustine. Inside, the church has two rows of columns supporting a clerestory, with aisles on either side. The chancel is demarcated by a marble altar rail and there are five altars which were reused from the original 1863 church. The interior is also decorated with a variety of frescoes, murals, and sculptures. The windows were imported from Austria.

References

Roman Catholic churches in Pittsburgh
Roman Catholic churches completed in 1901
20th-century Roman Catholic church buildings in the United States
1900s architecture in the United States
Lawrenceville (Pittsburgh)
Pittsburgh History & Landmarks Foundation Historic Landmarks
Religious organizations established in 1863
Religious organizations disestablished in 1993